Howard Ross (born Renato Rossini; 10 January 1941) is an Italian film actor.

Born in Rome, Rossini got his first major roles in peplum films. In the mid-1960s he eventually adopted the stage name Howard Ross. He was mainly active in genre films, specializing in adventure films, giallo films and poliziotteschi.

Selected filmography

Hercules Against the Mongols (1963)
Hercules the Invincible (1964)
Samson and His Mighty Challenge (1964)
Gladiators Seven (1964)
Hercules Against the Barbarians (1964)
Sword of the Empire (1965)
The Relentless Four (1965)
Dirty Heroes (1967)
Desert Commandos (1967)
Emma Hamilton (1968)
Bridge Over the Elbe (1969)
Poppea's Hot Nights (1969)
Battle of Neretva (1969)
Five Dolls for an August Moon (1970)
Viva Cangaceiro (1970)
Marta (1971)
Naked Girl Killed in the Park (1972)
Il Boss (1973)
The Man Called Noon (1973)
Those Dirty Dogs (1973)
Stateline Motel  (1973)
Number One (1973)The Killer Reserved Nine Seats (1974)Five Women for the Killer (1974)Order to Kill (1975)Oh, Serafina! (1976)Werewolf Woman (1976)Merciless Man (1976)The Pyjama Girl Case (1977)Interno di un convento (1977)L'Immoralitá (1978)The Mafia Triangle (1981)The New York Ripper (1982)Warriors of the Year 2072 (1984)I giorni dell'inferno (1986) - GraysonVacanze di Natale '95'' (1995) - Bob

References

External links
 
 Howard Ross at Gazillionmovies.com

1941 births
Living people
Italian male film actors
Male actors from Rome
Male Spaghetti Western actors
People of Lazian descent